A Girl With Ideas is a 1937 American comedy-drama film, directed by S. Sylvan Simon for Universal Pictures. It stars Wendy Barrie, Walter Pidgeon, and Kent Taylor.

Cast
 Wendy Barrie - Mary Morton
 Walter Pidgeon - Mickey McGuire
 Kent Taylor - Frank Barner
 Dorothea Kent - Isabelle Foster
 George Barbier - John Morton
 Henry Hunter = William Duncan
 Samuel S. Hinds - Rodding Carter
 Edward Gargan - Eddie
 Ted Osborne - Bailey
 Horace McMahon - Al
 George Humbert - Toni
 Norman Willis - Hanson

References

External links
A Girl With Ideas at the Internet Movie Database

1937 films
American comedy-drama films
1937 comedy-drama films
Films directed by S. Sylvan Simon
Universal Pictures films
American black-and-white films
1930s English-language films
1930s American films